Cathedral Parkway may refer to:

 110th Street (Manhattan), a street in New York City also known as Cathedral Parkway

New York City Subway
Cathedral Parkway – 110th Street (IRT Broadway – Seventh Avenue Line), serving the  train
Cathedral Parkway – 110th Street (IND Eighth Avenue Line), serving the  trains